Ron Wilson may refer to:

Entertainment
 Ron Wilson (CBC radio host) (born 1958), Canadian radio host, former host of CBC's Edmonton A.M.
 Ron Wilson (Clear Channel radio host), host of the American syndicated radio program In the Garden with Ron Wilson
 Ron Wilson (comics), comic book artist
 Ron Wilson (drummer) (1944–1989), played drums on "Wipe Out"
 Ron Wilson (magician) (1926–2010)
 Ron Wilson, former host of "Talk of the Town" on CFBC radio

Sports
 Ron Wilson (footballer, born 1924) (1924–2007), English footballer with West Ham United
Ron Wilson (footballer, born 1941), Scottish footballer with Port Vale
Ron Wilson (ice hockey, born 1955), Canadian born American NHL coach and former player
Ron Wilson (ice hockey, born 1956), Canadian AHL assistant coach and former NHL player
Ron Wilson (Australian footballer) (1915–1984), Australian footballer
Ron Wilson (rugby union) (born 1954), Scottish rugby union player
Ronald Wilson (field hockey) (born 1948), Australian Olympic hockey player
 Ronald Elliot-Wilson (1907–1954), South African cricketer

Others
 Ronald Martin Wilson (1886–1967), architect and engineer in Brisbane, Queensland, Australia
 Ronald Wilson (1922–2005), Australian lawyer and activist
 Ron Wilson (newsreader) (born 1954), Irish-born Australian television newsreader
 Ron Wilson (Australian politician) (born 1958), Victorian MP
 Ron Wilson (American politician) (born 1943), American businessman convicted in a Ponzi scheme